Wang Menghao (born September 25, 1992) is a Chinese baseball pitcher who plays with the Sichuan Dragons in the China Baseball League. 

Wang represented China at the 2017 World Baseball Classic.

References

1992 births
Living people
2017 World Baseball Classic players
Chinese baseball players
Baseball pitchers
Sichuan Dragons players